The following is an episode list for the MTV animated television series Beavis and Butt-Head. The series has its roots in 1992 when Mike Judge created two animated shorts, Frog Baseball and Peace, Love and Understanding, which were aired on Liquid Television.

Series overview

Episodes

Pilots (1992) 
These originally aired as part of Liquid Television and did not include music videos.

Season 1 (1993) 
Mike Judge himself is highly critical of the animation and quality of these episodes, in particular the first two—"Door to Door" and "Give Blood/Blood Drive"—which he described as "Horrible. Those first two episodes were awful, I don't know why anybody liked it... I was burying my head in the sand."

J. J. Sedelmaier Productions, Inc. (Season 1)

Season 2 (1993)

Season 3 (1993–94)

Season 4 (1994)

Season 5 (1994–95)

Season 6 (1995–96)

Season 7 (1997) 
Starting this season, the show switched to a 7-minute short act, with most of the shorts running approximately 5 minutes with one music video at the end.

Season 8 (2011)

Season 9 (2022)
On July 1, 2020, it was announced that two new seasons of Beavis and Butt-Head had been ordered. Produced for Paramount+, the first new season of Mike Judge's Beavis and Butt-Head premiered on August 4, 2022. The season made its linear premiere on February 8, 2023 on Comedy Central.

Season 10 (2023)
On March 8, 2023, Paramount+ announced that the series would return with a new season set to premiere April 20, 2023.

Films

Miscellaneous appearances 
 Appearances at the 1992 MTV Video Music Awards, 1993 MTV Video Music Awards, 1994 MTV Video Music Awards, 1995 MTV Video Music Awards, 1996 MTV Video Music Awards, 1997 MTV Movie Awards, 69th Academy Awards, MTV's 20th Anniversary, 2005 MTV Video Music Awards and 2011 MTV Video Music Awards
Appearance in a Paramount+ commercial in Super Bowl LV. They also appeared in four Super Bowl specials from 1994 to 1997.
 Appearance in the April 1993 music video for AC/DC's "Back in Black" (called the "Beavis and Butt-Head Version" on MTV's website)
 Appearance (in voice only) on the 1994 movie Airheads
 Appearance on The Brothers Grunt episode "Close Encounters of the Grunt Kind" (12/19/1994)
 Appearance in Clueless
 Appearances on Late Show with David Letterman (12/1993 and 12/13/1996)
 Appearance at the end of the Friends episode "The One Where Ross and Rachel... You Know" (during the credits roll, Joey and Chandler watch them on TV; 02/08/1996)
 Appearances on Saturday Night Live (12/14/1996 and 9/02/2003)
 Mentioned in the "Animated Videos" episode of MTV's All Time Top 10 by Daria Morgendorffer (in the style of her own series) and Jane Lane, and their music video for "Love Rollercoaster" is featured (6/28/1998)
 Appearance on Celebrity Deathmatch
 Appearance in Duke Nukem 3D (PC version) (Butt-Head's voice only – voiced by Randy Pitchford)
 Appearance in Duke Nukem 64 (Butt-Head's voice only – voiced by Randy Pitchford)
 Appearance on Jackassworld.com: 24 Hour Takeover (watched the music video for Steve-O's song "Poke the Puss" and provided negative commentary) (2/23/2008)
 Appearance in a promotional video for Mike Judge's 2009 film Extract
 Appearance in Austin Powers: International Man of Mystery
 Appearance in Jackass 3D
 Appearance on Jimmy Kimmel Live! (10/25/2011)
 Appearance on Two and a Half Men episode "A Possum on Chemo" (01/16/2012)
 Appearance in Sandy Wexler (during the end credits, voiced by Mike Judge)
 Appearance on Family Guy episode "Peter & Lois' Wedding" (11/10/2019 - voiced by Mike Judge)

References

External links 
 Beavis and Butt-Head at the Big Cartoon DataBase
 Beavis and Butt-Head at epguides.com
 Beavis and Butt-Head (2022) at epguides.com

 
Lists of American adult animated television series episodes
Lists of American sitcom episodes
Lists of American teen comedy television series episodes
Lists of sex comedy television series episodes